Tikkavarapu Pattabhirama Reddy (19 February 1919 – 6 May 2006) was an Indian film screenwriter, producer, director, social activist, poet, and writer known for his pioneering works in Telugu cinema, and Kannada cinema.

Reddy has received three National Film Awards for his works. In 1972 he produced and directed Samskara which garnered the National Film Award for Best Feature Film and Bronze Leopard at the Locarno International Film Festival. Reddy has actively participated the Indian Emergency opposition movement, human rights movement, and child labor movements as founder member of People's Union for Civil Liberties. In 1977, he produced and directed the bilingual Chandamarutha in Kannada, and English. The film was banned during the Emergency, and was later released to critical appreciation.

Personal life
Pattabhirama Reddy was born in Nellore, Andhra Pradesh into a Telugu speaking family. He studied at Shantiniketan, Calcutta University and  Columbia University. He was married to Snehalata Reddy, and founded the organisation Concerned for Working Children. In 2003, he directed In the Hour of God, a play based on Sri Aurobindo's classic Savitri, inspired by the mythical woman who defied death for love, which he dedicated to his wife Snehalata Reddy. Pattabhirama Reddy died on 6 May 2006, at the age of 86.

Literature
Fidelu Ragala Dozen (1939), (Telugu)
Kaitha Naa Dayita 1978, (Telugu)
Pattabhi Panchangam (1980), (Telugu)

Selected filmography
As producer
Pellinaati Pramanalu (executive producer) - Telugu (1958) 
Sri Krishnarjuna Yuddhamu (executive producer) - Telugu (1963)
Bhagya Chakramu (executive producer) - Telugu (1965)
Chandamarutha - Kannada
Shrungaramasa - Kannada
Devarakadu - Kannada

As producer and director
Samskara (1970)
Chanda Marutha (1977)
Devara Kaadu (1993)
Sringara Masa (1984)

Awards and honors
National Film Awards
National Film Award for Best Feature Film in Telugu - Pellinati Pramanalu (Telugu) - 1958 (executive Producer)
National Film Award for Best Feature Film - Samskara (Kannada) - 1971 (Director and Producer)
National Film Award for Best Film on Environment Conservation/Preservation - Devara Kadu - 1992 (Director and Producer)

Karnataka State Film Awards
Karnataka State Film Award for Second Best Film - Samskara - 1971 (Director and Producer)

International honors
Bronze Leopard at Locarno International Film Festival (1972)

State honors
Puttanna Kanagal Award from the Government of Karnataka
Honorary Doctorate from Andhra University

References

1919 births
2006 deaths
Telugu people
Telugu film directors
Kannada film directors
People from Nellore
Indian male dramatists and playwrights
Indian arts administrators
20th-century Indian dramatists and playwrights
Indian male stage actors
Visva-Bharati University alumni
University of Calcutta alumni
Indian human rights activists
Film directors from Andhra Pradesh
Indian experimental filmmakers
Indian casting directors
Indian male screenwriters
Producers who won the Best Film on Environment Conservation/Preservation National Film Award
20th-century Indian film directors
Film producers from Andhra Pradesh
Screenwriters from Andhra Pradesh
Producers who won the Best Feature Film National Film Award
Kannada screenwriters
Directors who won the Best Feature Film National Film Award
Directors who won the Best Film on Environment Conservation/Preservation National Film Award
20th-century Indian screenwriters